Home is a 2006 documentary film about New York and the concept of "home" from the perspective of recent Irish Immigrant Alan Cooke, along with a number of notable New York City residents.

Cast
(All persons named appear as themselves.)

Woody Allen
David Amram
Alan Cooke
Armand DiMele
Pete Hamill
Elaine Kaufman
Fran Lebowitz
Frank McCourt
Malachy McCourt
Alfred Molina
Mike Myers
Liam Neeson
Drew Nieporent
Rosie Perez
Colin Quinn
Susan Sarandon
Vinny Vella

References

External links

2006 films
American documentary films
2006 documentary films
Films shot in New York City
Documentary films about New York City
2000s English-language films
2000s American films
English-language documentary films